Tama are a non-Arab, African ethnic group of people who live in eastern Chad and western Sudan. They speak Tama, a Nilo-Saharan language. The population is 200,000–300,000 people and they practice Islam. Many Tama are subsistence farmers who live in permanent settlements and some raise livestock. In the civil war in Chad (2005–2010) the Tama were involved in ethnic conflicts with the Zaghawa tribe.

Culture
The Tama people are a non-Arab (i.e., "Indigenous African" ) tribe that live in Dar Tama in northeastern Chad and Darfur in western Sudan. They number 200,000–300,000. They speak Tama, a Nilo-Saharan language. Many of the Tama are subsistence farmers who live in permanent settlements and raise millet, beans, cucumbers, gumbo, and sesame. They also raise cattle, camels and goats. The majority of Tama are Muslims, but they also have some animistic beliefs.

Subgroups
The Tama are made up of a number of subgroups: Abu Sharib (approximately 50,000 people), Asungor (60,000), Dagel, Erenga (35,000), Gimr (50,000), Kibet, Marari (20,000), Mileri (9,000), and Tama proper.

The traditional home of the Tama is Dar Tama. All reside in Chad, except the Gimr and the Mileri, who live near Saref Omra and Kebkabiya in Sudan. In 2006, due to violence between the Tama and the Zaghawa, 1,800 Tama refugees fled to Mile and Kounoungo, United Nations-sponsored refugee camps.

Governance
For centuries, the Tama were governed by sultans. Many of these were believed to be of Dadjo origin. In the 1800s they were a warlike tribe who was known for their use of the spear, who had maintained their independence for the previous two centuries. On at least two occasions, they resisted the invasions from other tribes.

At various times they have been subjected to the sultans of Wadai on the west and Darfur on the east, but have always had their own sultan. For example, they were part of the Sultanate of Darfur in the early 1800s. Turkish-Egyptian Sudan governed the area in the late 1800s. During the French colonial period, France really only governed southern Chad, and therefore not the Dar Tama region, but a figurehead sultan was put in place to govern the area.

Zaghawa ethnic tension
During the Sahelian drought of the 1980s, the Zaghawa migrated to Dar Tama and displaced some of the Tama.

At the time of the Chadian civil war the rebel group United Front for Democratic Change (FUC) largely consisted of Tama. The Zaghawa felt the Tama supported this rebel group that opposed the Chadian government, which was led by President Idriss Déby, a member of the Zaghawa tribe, though there was little activity of any rebel group on the community level.

A 2006 robbery of a Tama man and an ensuing gunfight that caused 20 deaths and 9 serious injuries was cited as the event that triggered increased violence. After that, the Zaghawa increased the frequency and violence of their theft of Tama cattle. In 2006, dozens of Tama were killed by Zaghawa militants and thousands of Tama were displaced after Zaghawa attacks on Tama villages.

In August 2006, 3,300 Tama civilians fled from Dar Tama to Sudan because some Zaghawa accused a Tama man of raping one of their women. In October, 1,800 refugees fled to Mile and Kounoungo, UN-sponsored refugee camps. Human Rights Watch could not corroborate allegations of Tama attacks on Zaghawa civilians. The Chadian government and police did little to investigate or condemn the increasing violence.

References

Bibliography

Ethnic groups in Chad
Ethnic groups in Sudan